Mickel Carlos Miller (born 2 December 1995) is an English professional footballer who plays as a forward for League One club Plymouth Argyle.

Club career

Carshalton Athletic 
Miller progressed through the youth ranks at Isthmian League Premier Division club Carshalton Athletic and broke into the senior team for the 2013–14 season. On 15 April 2014, he made his debut in a 1–0 win at Leiston. In December 2014, he was rewarded for his form and signed a part-time contract with the club.

Miller appeared in every league match during the 2016–17 season. On 25 March 2017, he scored his first hat-trick in a 4–1 win against Herne Bay.

His appearances attracted the attention of several Football League clubs, and in May 2017, he became a part of Jamie Vardy's V9 Academy. In July 2017, Miller trialled with Sheffield Wednesday.

After being an unused substitute on 26 August 2017, his run of 49 consecutive league appearances came to an end. However, he marked his return to action with a brace against Corinthian-Casuals, an FA Cup hat-trick against Pagham and the opening goal in 2–1 win against Faversham Town.

On 20 November 2017, he scored his second hat-trick in a 6–2 win against Egham Town in the Surrey Senior Cup. He also netted all three goals in a 3–0 win against Sittingbourne on 6 January 2018.

Hamilton Academical 
On 20 January 2018, Carshalton Athletic announced that Miller had agreed terms with Scottish Premiership side Hamilton Academical. Nine days later, Hamilton confirmed the signing for an undisclosed fee. After being named as an unused substitute on three occasions, Miller made his professional debut in a 2–0 win against Motherwell on 10 March 2018.

Miller had a successful 2018–19 season with Hamilton Academical where he finished as the club's top goalscorer.

In February 2019 Hamilton Academical activated their option to extend his contract to keep him until summer 2020.

Rotherham United 
Miller joined Rotherham United on 5 July 2020 on a two-year deal. On 22nd August 2020, Mickel made his first start for Rotherham in a pre-season fixture scoring a header in a 3-0 win v Mansfield.

Miller joined Northampton Town on loan until the end of the 2020–21 season on 14 January 2021.

Miller was released at the end of the 2021–22 season.

Personal life 
Miller attended Stanley Park High School. He is an ambassador for Unique Talent.

Career statistics

Honours
Rotherham United
League One runner-up: 2021–22
EFL Trophy: 2021–22

References

1995 births
Living people
Footballers from Croydon
English footballers
Association football forwards
Carshalton Athletic F.C. players
Hamilton Academical F.C. players
Rotherham United F.C. players
Northampton Town F.C. players
Plymouth Argyle F.C. players
Scottish Professional Football League players
English Football League players
V9 Academy players
Black British sportspeople